"Some Say" is a song by Swedish singer Nea and was released as her debut single on 6 September 2019. Following the song's success in Europe in late 2019 and early 2020, the song was remixed by German DJ Felix Jaehn. The remix was released on 10 January 2020.

The song has since reached number one in Belgium (Wallonia), Slovakia and Poland, the top ten in Austria, Denmark, Hungary,  the Netherlands, Norway, Romania and Switzerland, as well as the top 20 in Australia, Belgium (Flanders), France, Germany and Sweden. The song interpolates Eiffel 65's "Blue (Da Ba Dee)" (1998).

Lyrically, it sees Nea singing about an unrequited love and is inspired by events experienced by a friend of hers. Nea describes that "the song is about love that you can't attain but that you can't give up on". On Genius, she explained that the opening lyrics of the song describe the moment "when you love someone so completely and the other person doesn’t feel the same thing, you just wanna put the blame on something else… The time, the timing, anything but unreturned love."

Credits and personnel
Credits adapted from Tidal.

 Linnéa Södahl – vocals, songwriting, composer
 Bryn Christopher – songwriting, composer
 Vincent Kottkamp – production, composer, guitar, mixing engineering
 Hitimpulse – production, mixing engineering
 Alexsej Vlasenko – composer, synthesizer
 Jonas Kalisch – composer, bass
 Henrik Meinke – composer, drums
 Jeremy Chacon – composer, keyboards
 Lex Barkey – master engineering
 Jeffrey Jey (Eiffel 65) – songwriter
 Maurizio Lobina (Eiffel 65) – songwriter/producer
 Gabry Ponte (Eiffel 65) – producer

Charts

Weekly charts

Year-end charts

Certifications

See also
"I'm Good (Blue)" – by David Guetta and Bebe Rexha

References

2019 songs
2019 debut singles
Number-one singles in Poland
Ultratop 50 Singles (Wallonia) number-one singles
Sony Music singles
Songs written by Linnea Södahl
Songs written by Maurizio Lobina
Songs written by Bryn Christopher